Karlivka is a city and the administrative center of Karlivka Raion, Poltava Oblast, Ukraine. Population:

Gallery

Social objects 
 Nina Gerasimenko Charles High School.
 School №1.
 School №3.
 School №4.
 House of children's and youth creativity.
 School of Arts.
 Charles Vocational School.
 Central District Hospital.
 House of Culture.
 Museum.

Economics 
According to the nature of production, the city is industrial and agricultural. On the territory of the city are: OJSC "Karlovysk Machine-Building Plant", OJSC "Karlovy Vary Plant", October Alcohol Plant, LLC "Karlovsky Sugar Factory", OJSC "Furniture Factory", OJSC "Karlovsky Bakery", Oil and Gas Expedition of Deep Drilling Management, farms, 4 repair and construction companies, motor transport enterprise ATП-15340 and others. 18 companies in total.

On the territory of the city council there are two reformed agricultural enterprises, 4 farms.

In April 2019, the construction of a cooperative factory of the Association of Milk Producers began, with 10 participants being the founders, and it is planned to be put into operation at the end of 2021. The first stage of the plant will allow processing approximately 500 tons of extra-class milk daily. Further capacity of the plant will be increased to 1000 tons.

Farms located within 300 km of the plant will be involved in cooperation with the enterprise. The company will produce elite semi-hard and hard cheeses and plan to deep-process the whey.

Notable people
 Trofim Lysenko (1898–1976), Soviet Ukrainian agrobiologist, promoter of the pseudoscientific agricultural and heritability of acquired characteristics theories termed Lysenkoism, which was official Soviet policy
 Nikolai Podgorny (1903-1983), Soviet politician,  Chairman of the Presidium of the Supreme Soviet (1965-1977)

See also
 Karlivka (disambiguation)

References 

Cities in Poltava Oblast
Konstantinogradsky Uyezd
Cities of district significance in Ukraine